Quendon and Rickling is a civil parish in the Uttlesford district of Essex, England with an area of 2,048 acres. The population of the civil parish at the 2011  was 587. It is a linear settlement on the B1383 (formerly the A11 trunk road) between Saffron Walden and Bishops Stortford. Quendon & Rickling stand 300 feet above sea level on a watershed between two rivers: the Cam to the east, flowing north through Cambridge to the Ouse flowing on to the Wash.

Etymology 
The parish and its name were created on 1 April 1949 by the merger of Quendon and Rickling parishes. Rickling derives from an Old English personal name Ricula with a suffix meaning 'descendants' or 'followers', thus ‘the people of Ricula’. The wife of King Sledda of the East Saxons (c.587-604) and sister of Æthelberht of Kent was named Ricula, though an association with this manor has not been proven.

History 
People were living in the area over ten thousand years ago because of the Neolithic and Palaeolithic remains found. The village of Rickling was mentioned in the Doomsday Book of 1086. In circa 1200 the churches of the parish were built.

Both villages are known for their halls: Quendon Hall and Rickling Hall, where until the 1960s most of the parish was employed to work the farms of the estates.  The parish mostly consists of 17th Century housing; between 1951 and 1961 the number of houses increased from 171 to only 172. This is shown by the attempts to create a conservation area. The population was recorded at 557 in the 1951 census, decreasing to 514 by 2001.

The conjoined settlement contains two churches: St Simon & St Jude, Quendon and All Saints, Rickling, which are both over 800 years old.

See also
 The Hundred Parishes

References

Civil parishes in Essex
Uttlesford